"Piano and Drums" is a postcolonial poem by Nigerian poet Gabriel Okara.

References

Postcolonial poetry
Poetry by Gabriel Okara